The 1938 Kinross and Western Perthshire by-election was held on 21 December 1938.  The by-election was held due to the resignation of the incumbent Unionist member of parliament Katharine Stewart-Murray, Duchess of Atholl, who resigned the Conservative and Unionist whip at Westminster as a protest against the National government led by Neville Chamberlain and his European policy of appeasement of the fascist dictators Hitler and Mussolini, seeking re-election as an Independent. However, the seat was regained for the Unionists by William McNair Snadden.

Result

See also
 1963 Kinross and Western Perthshire by-election

References

1938 in Scotland
1930s elections in Scotland
Perth and Kinross
1938 elections in the United Kingdom
By-elections to the Parliament of the United Kingdom in Scottish constituencies
Politics of Perth and Kinross